"Ghost of Love" is the debut single by new wave band Fiction Factory which was released in 1983 and appeared on the band's 1984 debut album, Throw the Warped Wheel Out. The song was re-released as a single again in 1984 following the success of "(Feels Like) Heaven". It was the last charting single in the UK for the band, peaking at No. 64 in the UK Singles Chart.  It was more successful in Germany spending 11 weeks on the singles chart, peaking at No. 49.  It was written by lead singer Kevin Patterson and produced by Peter Wilson.

Critical reception
In a review of the single's 1984 re-issue, Dave Rimmer of Smash Hits considered the song "distinctly dull". He wrote, "As with '(Feels Like) Heaven', what life it contains is in the chorus, but even that just sounds like ABC circa "Look of Love". Maureen Rice of Number One commented, "As soon as the first few bars are over, you know you've heard this somewhere before. I thought "Heaven" was a great pop single - but not so great that I'd buy it again speeded up a bit with a different title." Frank Edmonds of the Bury Free Press gave the song an 8 out of 10 rating and described it as a "very pleasing, melodic and attractive song, which should secure a second hit for the band".

Formats
7" single
"Ghost of Love" - 3:36
"The Other Side of Grey" - 4:14

12" single
"Ghost of Love (extended mix)" - 5:16
"The Other Side of Grey" - 4:14
"Old Game Blue Flame" - 2:55

Charts

References

1983 songs
1983 debut singles
1984 singles
Fiction Factory songs
CBS Records singles